Antipositive, Pt. 2 is the fourth studio album by the Russian punk-rave group Little Big. The album was released on 5 October 2018.

Background 
On 5 October 2018, the group released the album, along with an adaptation of the new track "Skibidi".

The album consists of seven tracks, among which for the first time, a French song called "Mon Ami". The group performed the chorus of the song earlier, long before the release of the album, at their concert in France.

On 22 February 2019, the band released a remix album Skibidi, which included five tracks.

Reception 
Boris Barabanov called the "Skibidi" track a repeat of the success of "Gangnam Style", and the album as a whole a milestone on the way of the group's transformation from the domestic Die Antwoord into the electronic Leningrad. At the same time, he noted that, compared to previous releases, Little Big's songs have become less 'cheerful fool' (often repulsive) and they now meet the standards of various musical styles.

Track listing

Personnel 
 Lyrics / vocals – Ilyich (Ilya Prusikin), Just Femi, Sonya Tayurskaya, Mr. Clown (Anton Lissov), Tommy Cash
 Music – Ilyich (Ilya Prusikin), Lubim (Lubim Khomchuk), Viktor Sibrinin
 Cover – Maxim Semenov

References 

2018 albums
Little Big (band) albums